Dennis Olshove (born January 18, 1950) is a politician from the U.S. state of Michigan. He is a former Democratic member of both houses of the Michigan Legislature and a current member of the Michigan Liquor Control Commission.

Personal
Dennis Olshove and his wife Fran were married in 1980. They have four children: Steven (Chelsea), Michael (Jenna), Marc, and Ryan.

Early life
Olshove attended De La Salle Collegiate High School, a Catholic, college preparatory high school previously located in Detroit, Michigan, before moving to Warren, Michigan, in 1982. He went to Michigan State University and has a B.A. in Communications.

Political career
Olshove served in the Michigan House of Representatives from 1991 to 1998. Since 1999, he has served in the Macomb County Board of Commissioners. Olshove was first elected to serve in the Michigan State Senate in 2002, and won re-election in 2006. In June 2012, Governor Rick Snyder appointed Olshove to an unexpired term on the Michigan Liquor Control Commission.

Electoral history
2006 election for Michigan State Senate - Michigan 9th District

{| class="wikitable"
|-
! Name
! Percent
|-
| Dennis Olshove (D)
|   66.3%
|-
| Jeremy Neilson (R)
|   29.7%
|-
| Richard Kuszmar (G)
|   1.4%
|-
| James Allison (L)
|   2.6%
|-
|}

2002 election for Michigan State Senate - Michigan 9th District

{| class="wikitable"
|-
! Name
! Percent
|-
| Dennis Olshove (D)
|   60.8%
|-
| Cecelia Stevens (R)
|   36.6%
|-
| Keith Edwards (L)
|   2.6%
|-
|}

References

External links
Project Vote Smart - Senator Dennis Olshove (MI) profile
Follow the Money - Dennis Olshove
2006 2004 2002 2000 1996 campaign contributions
Michigan Senate Democratic Caucus
Michigan Liberal - SD09

Democratic Party Michigan state senators
Democratic Party members of the Michigan House of Representatives
1950 births
Politicians from Detroit
Living people
20th-century American politicians
21st-century American politicians